Krevinian, or Krevin (Votic: Kreevini dialõkta) was a dialect of the Votic language, spoken in Latvia until the 1800s. It was spoken in the city of Bauske, in Courland.

The Krevinian dialect left loanwords into the Bauska dialects, such as kurika 'cudgel'.

Sample

References

Finnic languages
Languages of Latvia
Extinct languages of Europe
Votians